William Ronald Sacheverell Sitwell   (born 2 October 1969) is a British editor, writer and broadcaster. He is also a restaurant critic for The Daily Telegraph and the former editor of Waitrose Food.

Life and work 
Sitwell is the younger son of Francis Trajan Sacheverell Sitwell (1935-2004) and the grandson of writer and critic Sir Sacheverell Sitwell, 6th Baronet.  He is the great-nephew of writer Sir Osbert Sitwell, 5th Baronet and of poet and critic Dame Edith Sitwell.  He is the heir presumptive to the Sitwell Baronetcy currently held by his elder brother Sir George Sitwell, 8th Baronet. He was educated at Eton College and the University of Kent, where he 'wrote a stupid kind of gossip column in the student newspaper.'

He is a regular on MasterChef UK as a quarter final judge. He sets the brief for one group of quarter finalists and acts as the third judge alongside John Torode and Gregg Wallace.

He has written several internationally successful books on food: Eggs or Anarchy: The Remarkable Story of the Man Tasked with the Impossible: to Feed a Nation at War (2016), A History of Food in 100 Recipes (2017), The Really Quite Good British Cookbook (2017), and The Restaurant: A 2,000-Year History of Dining Out (2020).

Controversy 
In 2018 freelance journalist Selene Nelson emailed Sitwell, suggesting features on vegan-friendly recipes. Sitwell replied "How about a series on killing vegans, one by one. Ways to trap them? How to interrogate them properly? Expose their hypocrisy? Force-feed them meat?".

After Nelson made Sitwell's response public, Sitwell resigned. The row caused much controversy over free speech and whether making an offensive joke was a sackable offence. Sitwell later met Nelson in person to apologise. He has since joined The Daily Telegraph as a restaurant critic, and hosts a dining programme with the paper called William Sitwell's Supper Club. In April 2020 he appeared as a guest in an episode of the MasterChef TV programme, challenging contestants to produce "a plant-based dish".

In 2019 Sitwell wrote in the Daily Telegraph that 104 Restaurant Notting Hill, a restaurant he reviewed, had made threatening calls to him. Richard Wilkins, the chef of 104 Restaurant Notting Hill, took umbrage with William’s views in the Telegraph & took Sitwell to the Independent Press Standards Organisation (IPSO), which found that after an investigation, the newspaper accurately reported the situation and did not breach its policies.
 Ultimately, all charges were dismissed.

Personal life 
Sitwell is godfather to Mary, daughter of Conservative MP Jacob Rees-Mogg.

References

External links 
William Sitwell on The Daily Telegraph
William Sitwell news and commentary on the Evening Standard

Living people
1969 births
People educated at Eton College
Alumni of the University of Kent
British food writers
British magazine editors
British restaurant critics
British columnists
Critics of veganism
The Daily Telegraph people
English people of Canadian descent
British television journalists
William
Deputy Lieutenants of Northamptonshire